The Goffstown Covered Railroad Bridge was a rare railroad covered bridge in Goffstown, New Hampshire.  It was built in 1901 by the Boston and Maine Railroad, on the site of an earlier bridge built in 1850 by the New Hampshire Central Railroad, and carried its tracks across the Piscataquog River in the center of Goffstown.  The bridge was listed on the National Register of Historic Places in 1975. It was destroyed by arson in 1976, as would later be the case with the Hillsborough Railroad Bridge in 1985.

Description and history
The Goffstown Covered Railroad Bridge was located in the village center of Goffstown, just east of the bridge carrying New Hampshire Route 114 (Main Street) across the Piscataquog River. The bridge was oriented at an angle to the banks of the river, on granite slab abutments that are still visible, capped in concrete. Its trusses were a combination of Town lattice trusses and Pratt trusses, with an integrated laminated arch. Portions of the trusses have iron reinforcements in the form of turnbuckles. The railroad deck was supported by a web of timbers anchored into the trusses.

The first bridge on the site was built about 1850 by the New Hampshire Central Railroad.  In 1895 the line came under control of the Boston and Maine Railroad, which built this bridge as a replacement in 1901.  The line, which originally ran to Henniker, was abandoned to Goffstown (ending short of this bridge) in the 1930s, and was still in operation to that point when the bridge was listed on the National Register in 1975.

The bridge was destroyed by a deliberately set fire on August 16, 1976. Heat from  the burning bridge  was so intense that paint blistered on the fire engines parked nearby. At the time, the Boston & Maine Railroad was still serving two customers on the western side of the river, Kendall-Hadley Lumber and Merrimack Farmers Exchange. Despite this, the railroad decided not to replace the bridge. Freight service still ran on the line east of the river until September 20, 1980, with total abandonment following in February 1981.

See also

List of New Hampshire covered bridges
List of bridges on the National Register of Historic Places in New Hampshire
National Register of Historic Places listings in Hillsborough County, New Hampshire

References

Covered bridges on the National Register of Historic Places in New Hampshire
Bridges completed in 1901
Bridges in Hillsborough County, New Hampshire
National Register of Historic Places in Hillsborough County, New Hampshire
Goffstown, New Hampshire
Railroad bridges on the National Register of Historic Places in New Hampshire
Covered bridges in the United States destroyed by arson
Wooden bridges in New Hampshire
Pratt truss bridges in the United States